The Chongar Strait is a short, shallow, narrow strait separating the eastern and western portions of the Syvash, the shallow lagoon system separating the Crimea from the mainland east of the Isthmus of Perekop.

Overview
The strait separates Chongar Peninsula in the north (on the mainland of Ukraine, and containing the village of Chongar) from the Tup-Dzhankoi Peninsula in the south (in the Crimea).
Two bridges cross the strait. One carries (in peacetime) the Ukrainian M18 highway (not to be confused with the Russian M18 highway), which is part of European route E105 running from northern Norway to Yalta. The other bridge is abandoned.

During the Russian Civil War, the Chongar Strait was one avenue of attack during the Perekop-Chongar Operation in November 1920 and was crossed by the Soviet 30th Rifle Division. The operation resulted in the Soviet capture of the Crimea and forced the final evacuation of Wrangel's White Army and the end of the Civil War in the south.

Since the 2014 Annexation of Crimea by the Russian Federation, the Chongar Strait forms part of the de facto border between Ukraine and the Republic of Crimea, and has been militarized.

References

Straits of Crimea
Straits of Ukraine
Russia–Ukraine border
Geography of Kherson Oblast
Sea of Azov